The 2021 Tipperary Senior Football Championship was the 131st staging of the Tipperary Senior Football Championship since its establishment by the Tipperary County Board in 1887. 

Clonmel Commercials were the defending champions but lost in the final to Loughmore–Castleiney.

Team Changes
The following teams have changed division since the 2020 Tipperary Senior Football Championship.

To S.F.C.
Promoted from 2020 Tipperary I.F.C.
 Rockwell Rovers

From S.F.C.
Relegated to 2021 Tipperary I.F.C.
 Galtee Rovers

Group stage

Group 1

Results

Group 2

Results

Group 3

Results

Group 4

Results

Finals

Bracket

Quarter-finals

Semi-finals

Final

Championship statistics

Miscellaneous
 Loughmore–Castleiney won the double for the second time in their history.

References

Tipperary Senior Football Championship
2021 senior Gaelic football county championships